Marion Romanelli (born 24 July 1996) is a French football player.

Honours

International 

 France U17
 FIFA U-17 Women's World Cup winner in Azerbaijan, 2012
 UEFA Women's Under-17 Championship runner-up in Switzerland, 2012

References

External links
 
 
 Profile at Montpellier HSC 
 Player French football stats at footofeminin.fr 
 
 

1996 births
Living people
French women's footballers
Montpellier HSC (women) players
French people of Italian descent
Sportspeople from Aix-en-Provence
Women's association football defenders
ASPTT Albi players
Division 1 Féminine players
Footballers from Provence-Alpes-Côte d'Azur